HK Kolskaya GMK is a bandy club in Monchegorsk, Russia. The club was founded in 1957 and has earlier been playing in the Russian Bandy Super League, the top-tier of Russian bandy. The home games are played at DYuSSh-3 Stadium in Monchegorsk. The club colours are white and blue.

References

Bandy clubs in Russia
Bandy clubs in the Soviet Union
Sport in Murmansk Oblast
Bandy clubs established in 1957
1957 establishments in Russia